Fonzo may refer to:

 Fonzo, West Virginia, an unincorporated community in Ritchie County, West Virginia
 Capone (2020 film), the original name of the 2020 American biographical drama film
 Fonzo Fargo, a "ring name" of professional wrestler Don Fargo